In enzymology, an UDP-N-acetylglucosamine—dolichyl-phosphate N-acetylglucosaminephosphotransferase is an enzyme that catalyzes the chemical reaction

UDP-N-acetyl-D-glucosamine + dolichyl phosphate  UMP + N-acetyl-D-glucosaminyl-diphosphodolichol

Thus, the two substrates of this enzyme are UDP-N-acetyl-D-glucosamine and dolichyl phosphate, whereas its two products are UMP and N-acetyl-D-glucosaminyl-diphosphodolichol.

This enzyme belongs to the family of transferases, specifically those transferring phosphorus-containing groups transferases for other substituted phosphate groups.  The systematic name of this enzyme class is UDP-N-acetyl-D-glucosamine:dolichyl-phosphate N-acetyl-D-glucosaminephosphotransferase.  Other names in common use include UDP-D-N-acetylglucosamine N-acetylglucosamine 1-phosphate transferase, UDP-GlcNAc:dolichyl-phosphate GlcNAc-1-phosphate transferase, UDP-N-acetyl-D-glucosamine:dolichol phosphate N-acetyl-D-glucosamine-1-phosphate transferase, uridine diphosphoacetylglucosamine-dolichyl phosphate acetylglucosamine-1-phosphotransferase, chitobiosylpyrophosphoryldolichol synthase, dolichol phosphate N-acetylglucosamine-1-phosphotransferase, UDP-acetylglucosamine-dolichol phosphate acetylglucosamine phosphotransferase, and UDP-acetylglucosamine-dolichol phosphate acetylglucosamine-1-phosphotransferase. This enzyme participates in the biosynthesis of N-glycan and glycan structures.

References

 
 

EC 2.7.8
Enzymes of unknown structure